Thianges is a commune in the Nièvre department in central France.

See also
Communes of the Nièvre department
Gabrièlle de Rochechouart de Mortemart, marquise de Thianges

References

Communes of Nièvre